Micrina is an extinct genus of tommotiids with affinities to brachiopods.

Micrina can be considered a stem group brachiopod based on its larval shell

Its microstructure is very brachiopod like and its adult morphology is similarly bivalved, even though it was once thought to be halkieriid-like.

Micrina is quite similar to Mickwitzia in terms of shell microstructure. The two genera are evidently closely related.

Species

M. etheridgei (Tate, 1892)
M. pusilla Gravestock et al., 2001
M. ridicula (Barskova, 1988)
M. xiaotanensis Li & Xiao, 2004

References

Prehistoric brachiopod genera
Cambrian brachiopods

Cambrian genus extinctions